Pyongyang International Airport , also known as the Pyongyang Sunan International Airport, is the main airport serving Pyongyang, the capital of North Korea. It is located in the city's Sunan District.  and the only two foreign countries served by Pyongyang International Airport are China and Russia.

History

Early years
During the period of Japanese occupation, two airports were built in Pyongyang. Pyongyang Air Base was built by the Empire of Japan in the 1940s and remained in use until the 1950s. A second airport, Mirim Airport, was also built by the forces of the empire of Japan in the 1940s and located east of the Taedong River. However, after World War II there was a need for a newer airport, and Sunan Airfield was constructed. Mirim Airport survived as a military airfield with Pyongyang Air Base re-developed for use by the government and housing.

During the Korean War, the airport was occupied by United Nations forces for seven weeks in late 1950. The forces flew large amounts of supplies to Sunan during this period. On 13 May 1953, the airport was inundated when the US Air Force bombed Toksan Dam. After an armistice was signed two months later, the North Korean Government started repairing and expanding the airport.

Soviet flag carrier Aeroflot was providing flights to Moscow and Khabarovsk in the mid-1980s. It was still serving Pyongyang in 1993 after the fall of the USSR, but eliminated the North Korean capital from its network sometime during the next two years. Meanwhile, Air Koryo offered a nonstop link to Europe during the 1990s. The airline was using Ilyushin IL-62s to fly to Moscow in 1998, with onward connections to Berlin and Sofia; however, it had ceased flights to all three destinations by 2002.

Development since the 2000s
Russian Sky Airlines operated charter services to Pyongyang from Russian destinations during the mid 2000s operated by Il-62M and Il-86 aircraft. China Southern Airlines offered scheduled charter flights to and from Beijing during the peak season only, and permanently pulled its flights in October 2006. In March 2008, Air China re-established service to Beijing on a Boeing 737, three days a week, and suspended due to lack of demand on 22 November 2017. Air Koryo, Korean Air and Asiana Airlines also provided chartered flight services to Seoul and Yangyang on the east coast of South Korea from Pyongyang. These flights were used by Korean family members visiting divided family across the border; these services were halted after the ending of the Sunshine Policy by South Korea in 2008. In June 2018, Air China resumed service from Beijing Capital Airport to Pyongyang.

Modernization 
By early 2011, an interim facility handling international flights had been constructed just south of the existing terminal. By early 2012, demolition of the existing terminal, which Kim Jong-un deemed too small and outdated, had begun. In July 2012, he ordered the construction of a new terminal. Besides this, a new control tower and VIP terminal north of the main terminal were also constructed. The project became part of a "speed campaign", in which thousands of workers were enlisted to quickly complete it.

September 2017 missile test

On 15 September 2017 at about 6:30am KST, North Korea fired a Hwasong-12 missile from the airport. The missile travelled 3,700 kilometers (2,300 mi) and reached a maximum height of 770 kilometers (480 mi).

Infrastructure

Pyongyang International Airport has two passenger terminals. Terminal 1 opened in January 2016 and solely handles domestic flights. It is connected to Terminal 2, the international terminal that was inaugurated on 1 July 2015. The terminal has jet bridges and at least 12 check-in counters. Amenities include a duty-free store, coffee bar, newsstand and Internet room, along with a snack bar, pharmacy, CD/DVD shop and electronics shop.

Business class lounge with buffet is on the upper level along with outdoor viewing area.

The airport has two functioning runway which is designated 17/35 and measures .  Runway 01/19 measures .

Yonhap reported in September 2016 that a maintenance facility had been constructed at the Pyongyang airport.

During the construction period a hangar-like structure served the airport with basic services (baggage carousel), as well as a duty-free shop, and a bookshop/souvenir shop.

Airlines and destinations

Pyongyang-Sunan serves 3 destinations to 2 countries with currently one airline.

Access

Gallery

See also
Mirim Airport
Pyongyang Air Base
Transport in North Korea
Wonsan Kalma International Airport

References

External links

360° virtual tour of the airport DPRK 360 photography project

Airports in North Korea
Transport in Pyongyang